Marie Ulven Ringheim (born 16 February 1999) is a Norwegian singer-songwriter and record producer, known for her indie pop project Girl in Red (stylized as girl in red). Her early EPs Chapter 1 (2018) and Chapter 2 (2019) were recorded in her bedroom and feature songs about romance and mental health. Released through AWAL, her debut studio album If I Could Make It Go Quiet (2021), was a critical and commercial success, and won three Norwegian Grammy Awards, including Album of the Year.

Girl in Red has been cited as a queer icon by Paper, and "one of the most astute and exciting singer-songwriters working in the world of guitar music" by The New York Times. In January 2021, her singles "I Wanna Be Your Girlfriend" (2017) and "We Fell in Love in October" (2018) were certified gold in the US.

Early life 
Marie Ulven Ringheim was born in the town of Horten, Norway on 16 February 1999. She grew up with her sisters and her divorced parents, and described Horten as "quiet and kinda boring" in an interview with Triple J in October 2019. Her mother worked with technology and her father worked as a policeman. Her grandfather could play the guitar and piano; however, she grew up without instruments in the home. While in high school, Ulven was curious about becoming a teacher before she was introduced to the guitar and songwriting at the age of 14. Ulven received her first guitar as a Christmas gift from her grandfather in 2012, but didn't start playing it until 2013 after losing interest in fingerboarding. She credits her grandfather for sparking her interest in music. Ulven had taught herself piano, guitar and music production from the comfort of her bedroom. She began by writing and releasing Norwegian music and planned to study music, but never concluded that she was going to become a musician.

Career

2015–2017: SoundCloud and "I Wanna Be Your Girlfriend" 
After getting a Blue Yeti microphone from her father in 2015, Ulven began writing and releasing Norwegian music to SoundCloud under the moniker of "Lydia X". She stopped attending guitar lessons after six months once her teacher refused to acknowledge her interest in songwriting and producing. Ulven coined the stagename "Girl in Red" after attempting to identify herself in a crowd to a friend via text. Using the new moniker, she published her debut single "I Wanna Be Your Girlfriend" on SoundCloud in November 2016, where it got about 5 thousand streams within five months. Following the single's feature on the Norwegian music website NRK Urørt, "I Wanna Be Your Girlfriend" amassed thousands of streams and gained Ulven a large online following.

2018–2019: Chapter 1 and Chapter 2 

Ulven's 2018 singles "Summer Depression" and "Girls" gained millions of views and streams online. In early 2019, she won her first award when she was presented with "Norwegian Newcomer of the Year" at the 2018 GAFFA Awards.

Ulven released "I Wanna Be Your Girlfriend" on Apple Music in March 2018. "I Wanna Be Your Girlfriend" was listed at number 9 on The New York Times list of "The 68 Best Songs of 2018" and won "Untouched of the Year" ("") at the 2018 P3 Gull awards. Ulven opened for Clairo in Dublin and Paris in September 2018. Ulven released her debut EP, Chapter 1, on 14 September 2018. Ulven released the standalone single "We Fell in Love in October" in November 2018, which would peak at number 14 on the US Rock Charts in October 2019.

Ulven embarked on her first North American tour supporting Conan Gray in March 2019. She released Chapter 2, her second EP, as well as Beginnings, a compilation of her entire single catalogue into one exclusively vinyl album, on 6 September 2019 through the music distributor AWAL. She embarked on her first international headlining "World in Red" tour in October 2019, performing in cities such as Dublin and San Francisco. Ulven was nominated for "Newcomer of the Year" at the 2019 P3 Gull awards.

2020–present: If I Could Make It Go Quiet 
In December 2019, Ulven signed a worldwide recording contract with British music distribution company AWAL. In a rare phenomenon for most new label signees, her entire existing discography, which had all originally been self-released, was subsequently registered under this label on all digital music platforms. Ulven appeared on the front cover of both Gay Times and Dork in December 2019, as well as the cover of NME in January 2020. She provided the single "Kate's Not Here" for the original soundtrack of the 2020 supernatural horror film The Turning. Ulven was nominated for the "Newcomer of the Year" award and, as a result, the Gramo scholarship at the 2020 Spellemannprisen, also known elsewhere as the Norwegian Grammy Awards. In May 2020, Ulven was included in the annual Dazed 100 list after her single "I Wanna Be Your Girlfriend" passed 150 million streams.

In mid 2020, Girl in Red became a popular symbol of queer identification on the online platform TikTok, where users would adopt the common phrase, "Do you listen to Girl in Red?" as a way of discreetly asking if someone is a lesbian. In November, she released the standalone holiday single "Two Queens in a King Sized Bed", shortly before she was awarded "Artist of the Year" at the 2020 P3 Gull Awards.

Ulven released her debut studio album, titled If I Could Make It Go Quiet, on 30 April 2021. The album has thus far been supported by four singles: "Midnight Love", in April 2020, "Rue" in August 2020, "Serotonin" in March 2021, and "You Stupid Bitch" in April 2021. The cover artwork for the album, made by Norwegian painter and artist Fredrik Wiig Sørensen, was originally an oil painting on a 80x80 cm canvas titled The Antizero. In 2022, Ulven signed to Irving Azoff's PRO, Global Music Rights (GMR).

In February 2022, Ulven signed a record deal with Columbia Records, following the success of If I Could Make It Go Quiet. The label confirmed the signing to American media company Variety.

On 14 October 2022, she released her latest single, "October Passed Me By", which is a sequel to "We Fell in Love in October".

Girl In Red will be an opening act on multiple shows of the US leg of Taylor Swift's upcoming The Eras Tour.

Artistry and influences 
The subject matters of Ulven's music range from romance and heartbreak to mental illness and the experience of being queer. She named Taylor Swift as one of her biggest musical influences.

Personal life 
Ulven now resides in the Grünerløkka district of Oslo. She identifies as gay and queer. She studied music production and songwriting at Westerdals Oslo School of Arts, Communication and Technology. Ulven revealed in 2021 that she has been diagnosed with obsessive–compulsive disorder and generalized anxiety disorder.

Discography

Studio albums

Compilation albums

Extended plays

Singles

As lead artist

As featured artist

Videography

Other appearances

Television

Awards and nominations

Tours 

Headlining
 The World in Red Tour (2019)
 Make It Go Quiet Tour (2022)

Supporting
 Fall Tour (2018) (Clairo)
 The Sunset Shows (2018–19) (Conan Gray)
 Happier Than Ever, The World Tour (2022) (Billie Eilish)
 The Eras Tour (2023) (Taylor Swift)

Notes

References

External links 

 
 
 
 Girl in Red on Spotify
 

1999 births
Living people
Musicians from Oslo
21st-century Norwegian musicians
Norwegian Internet celebrities
People from Horten
Norwegian lesbian musicians
Norwegian LGBT singers
Lesbian singers
Queer singers
Indie pop musicians
Indie rock musicians
Bedroom pop musicians
Musicians from Horten
20th-century Norwegian LGBT people
21st-century Norwegian LGBT people
People with obsessive–compulsive disorder